Mollie Lee was a BBC Radio presenter, known for her appearances on Woman's Hour, and novelist, under the name Mollie Hales.

Life 
She studied journalism at University of London and Russian at the School of Slavonic Studies. During that period, she undertook an internship at the Chatham Observer. She joined the BBC's Balkan service during World War II, transferring to its new Russian Service after the war. From there she moved to Woman's Hour, in 1957. While working for Woman's Hour, she was able to visit Russia for the first time.

Lee edited a series of BBC books featuring items from Woman's Hour.

She appeared as a castaway on the BBC Radio programme Desert Island Discs on 25 September 1971.

She was married, with one daughter.

Bibliography

References 

Year of birth missing
Place of birth missing
Year of death missing
Place of death missing
20th-century British novelists
BBC radio presenters
Alumni of the University of London
Alumni of University College London